Phono may refer to:

 Phone (phonetics), speech sound, gesture or segment
 Phonograph, regularly abbreviated to phono on buttons and jacks of audio equipment
 RCA connector, called "phono" since they originally connected to phonographs
 Phono (band), a Chilean rock band